Dečani or Dečane may refer to:

 Dečani (town), a town in Kosovo, also claimed by Serbia
 Municipality of Dečani, a municipality in Kosovo, also claimed by Serbia
 Monastery of Dečani, medieval Serbian Orthodox monastery
 Dečani chrysobulls, medieval charter of the Dečani Monastery
 Dečani Chronicle, a historical chronicle of the Dečani Monastery
 Stefan of Dečani, medieval Serbian King, founder of the Dečani Monastery
 Mojsije of Dečani, a Serbian Orthodox monk and printer from the 16th century
 Dečani Bistrica, a river in the Dečani region
 Dečani Mountain, a mountain in the Dečani region

See also
 Decan (disambiguation)
 Deccan (disambiguation)